Anna Sixtová (born 29 May 1996) is a Czech cross-country skier who competes internationally.

She competed for the Czech Republic at the FIS Nordic World Ski Championships 2017 in Lahti, Finland.

Cross-country skiing results
All results are sourced from the International Ski Federation (FIS).

World Championships

World Cup

Season standings

References

External links 
 
 

1996 births
Living people
Czech female cross-country skiers